George McLaughlan (born 18 January 1904, date of death unknown) was a Scottish professional footballer who played as an inside forward. During his career, he had spells at clubs in Scotland, England and Wales. He joined Celtic in 1923, but only made one league appearance for the club and was loaned out to Clydebank and Stenhousemuir. After leaving Celtic, McLaughlan had short stints at Clydebank and Mid Rhondda before joining Clyde in 1925. He was a part of the Clyde team that won the Scottish Cup that year, and in 1926 he moved to England with Football League Second Division side Darlington.

McLaughlan played one League match for Darlington before transferring to Hull City in June 1926. However, he again struggled to break into the first team and made only eight appearances for the club during the 1926–27 season. In May 1927, McLaughlan signed for Third Division North side Accrington Stanley and went on to score 21 goals in 76 league games for the Lancashire outfit. During the 1929–30 season, he played 29 matches for Nelson but was one of eight players released by the club in the summer of 1930. McLaughlan subsequently moved into non-League football with Morecambe of the Lancashire Combination.

References

1904 births
Year of death missing
Footballers from Glasgow
Scottish footballers
Association football forwards
Celtic F.C. players
Clydebank F.C. (1914) players
Stenhousemuir F.C. players
Mid Rhondda F.C. players
Clyde F.C. players
Darlington F.C. players
Hull City A.F.C. players
Accrington Stanley F.C. (1891) players
Nelson F.C. players
Morecambe F.C. players
Scottish Football League players
English Football League players
People from Bridgeton, Glasgow